Bulan tertusuk ilalang is a 1995 award-winning Indonesian
film directed by Garin Nugroho. Nugroho won the FIPRESCI Prize Forum of New Cinema at the Berlin International Film Festival in 1996.

Cast
Wiwiek Handawiyah as Retno
Ratna Paquita as Bulan
Norman Wibowo as Ilalang
Bambang S. Jayantoro as Little Ilalang
Pramana Padmodarmaya as Ilalang's father
Sri Rahayu as Wulan
Ki Sutarman as Waluyo

External links
 

1995 films
1990s Indonesian-language films
1995 drama films
Films directed by Garin Nugroho
Films shot in Indonesia
Indonesian drama films